The Masaoka Shiki International Haiku Awards, named after the founder of modern Japanese haiku, were established on the principles set forth in the Matsuyama Declaration, adopted at the Shimanamikaido '99 Haiku Convention in Matsuyama held in September 1999. The establishment of this award attracts people's attention to Masaoka Shiki as a globally recognized poet and to haiku as a short form of world poetry.

Purpose 
The Masaoka Shiki International Haiku Award is awarded to people who have made the most remarkable contribution to the development and the raising awareness of the creativity of haiku regardless of nationality or language. Recipients have a strong interest in haiku and a broad, international outlook in their field. The award is not limited to any field of speciality, so that haiku poets, other poets, authors, researchers, translators, essayists, editors, and workers in all professions are considered equally.

Awardees 
The First Masaoka Shiki International Haiku Awards 2000
 Grand Prize/ Yves Bonnefoy, France
 Haiku Prize/ Li Mang, China/ Bart Mesotten, Belgium/ Robert Spiess, United States of America
 EIJS Special Award/ Kazuo Sato, Japan
The Second Masaoka Shiki International Haiku Awards 2002
 Haiku Prize/ Cor van den Heuvel, United States of America/Satya Bhushan Verma, India
 EIJS Special Award/ Shigeki Wada, Japan
The Third Masaoka Shiki International Haiku Awards 2004
 Grand Prize/ Gary Snyder, United States of America
 Haiku Prize/ Hidekazu Masuda, Brazil/Ko Reishi, Taiwan
 EIJS Special Award/ Bansei Tsukushi, Japan
The Fourth Masaoka Shiki International Haiku Awards 2008
 Grand Prize/ Kaneko Tohta, Japan
 Haiku Prize/ Kawahara Biwao, Japan
 Haiku Prlze Sweden Award/ Uchida Sonoo, Japan/ Lee O-Young, South Korea

References 

 International Haiku Awards Announcement of Awardees for 2008
 Yves Bonnefoy (translated by Koji Kawamoto) and Description of Haiku and short form of poems and French Poets (translated by Toru Shiga)　(『Shincho』 December 2000)

Poetry awards
Haiku